Lil' Beethoven is the nineteenth studio album by the American rock band Sparks, released on October 14, 2002. The album was a radical musical departure compared to their previous works. The band only used strings, piano, and voices but no drums: the result was both classical and pop music. 

The album was received to critical acclaim in the UK and the US.

Background and recording
By 2002, Sparks had released eighteen albums, the last several of them in the new wave/synthpop vein. While this had been successful, breaking them in the US with 1983's "Cool Places" and in Germany with "When Do I Get To Sing 'My Way'?" in 1995, it had not secured them much critical acclaim or a consistent audience. 1997's Plagiarism, which consisted entirely of new recordings of earlier material, had been intended to introduce the group's back catalog to their new German audience, while building on the success with high-profile collaborations for the UK and US audience. It had only been partially successful.

The next album, Balls, had not been at all successful and was generally perceived as Sparks treading water. The duo had already written an entire album's worth of material for a follow-up, but found that they were unenthusiastic with the results and so the album was scrapped, a decision which they admitted was difficult but ultimately crucial for them to continue challenging themselves and evolving their sound. The Maels also found the musical landscape at the time to be uninspiring, which contributed to their attempt to produce something different. 

In 2001, the Maels were commissioned by a German broadcasting company to produce a song for Günther Koch Revisited (Voll In Den Mann), an album that featured samples of sports commentator Günther Koch set to music. The band's contribution, "Wunderbar", placed Koch's highly-spirited exclamations over an orchestral backing. The duo acknowledged that making the track provided them a blueprint for the direction that they would take on Lil' Beethoven. 

As has been the case with each Sparks album since 1988's Interior Design, the album was self-produced by the duo and recorded in Russell Mael's home studio. Work on the album was an intensive process, as the band refrained from using drum loops and samples and built up to 75 tracks of vocals and orchestration for each song. Ron Mael stated they packed about "five years' worth of work into one year" and that there were "a lot of dark alleys and false starts" during the recording. The most crucial change was the elimination of rhythm, which the band counteracted by replacing the songs' drive with "massive, aggressive" multi-tracked vocals. The majority of the orchestral arrangements on Lil' Beethoven were produced with a Yamaha S80 keyboard.

Sound
Described by the band themselves as a "career-defining opus", Lil' Beethoven saw the duo move into a more orchestral sound, with a heavy reliance on repetitive lyrics and piano lines, synthesized instrumentation and multi-tracked vocals in place of percussion, reminiscent of the minimalist works of composer Steve Reich. Opening track "The Rhythm Thief" serves as a manifesto to the band's new direction by declaring "say goodbye to the beat". "My Baby's Taking Me Home" largely consists of the title repeated over 100 times with no other words being used, other than a spoken interlude.  Similarly, "Your Call Is Very Important To Us" uses a corporation style call-hold message: "Your call is very important to us.  Please hold" which is then sung with some additional words: "At first she said your call is very important to us, then she said please, please hold."  The only other lyrics in the song are "Red light", "Green light", "I'm Getting Mixed Signals" and "Sorry, I'm Going To Have To Put You Back On Hold".  These elements are layered with a simple piano line to create a highly textured effect. The band have stated that, despite the title and abundance of orchestral sounds, they did not set out to create a 'classical' album, and that it was more an exercise in how big and aggressive they could sound with very basic elements.

Release
Lil' Beethoven, while critically acclaimed, did not chart inside the top 100 in the UK, Germany or the US. It was released in a limited edition which had hardcover book binding. The album was promoted by the single "Suburban Homeboy" but it, too, did not chart. The single was backed two b-sides, an extended version of "Suburban Homeboy", entitled "Suburban Homeboy (Extended 'Ron Speaks' Version)", and "Wunderbar (Concerto In Koch Minor)", which samples the voice of German sports commentator Günther Koch. The band had initially planned to release the album as Lil' Beethoven rather than Sparks, so that it wasn't pigeonholed with their previous albums, but eventually decided against it.

Re-releases 
In March 2004, Sparks re-issued Lil' Beethoven in a deluxe edition. This version had a black sleeve as opposed to the white original, and included three audio tracks (two of which were exclusive), a video of "The Rhythm Thief" (directed by long-time collaborators Kuntzel+Deygas), a short film by Ron Mael, and a screensaver. An LP version of the album (which did not include any bonus tracks) was also released at the same time.

A DVD produced by Demon Vision was also released of a live performance of the album. The live performance was filmed in March 2004 at the Södra Teatern in Stockholm, Sweden. The DVD features the album performed in full and in order, followed by a set of twelve other Sparks songs.

In April 2022, a remastered Lil' Beethoven was issued on LP and CD as part of the "21st Century Sparks" collection. The CD included the same bonus tracks as the 2004 reissue and two additional tracks. This time the album charted, entering the UK independent albums top 50 at no. 8.

Critical reception

The album was critically applauded, which led to renewed interest in the band. In a review titled "What the world’s been waiting for—Sparks’ very own Kid A", Mojo praised the album as being "an audacious mélange of crafty lyrics and beguilingly repetitive orchestral melodies. Record Collector magazine named the album as one of its Best New Albums of 2002, describing it as "possibly the most exciting and interesting release ever from such a long established act", and later in 2003 saying "it really does feel like one of the best albums ever made." In a four out of five star review, AllMusic declared: "it feels like you're listening to another record entirely -- every time you play it. And that is the magic of Lil' Beethoven." When it was released in 2003 in the US, PopMatters wrote that Lil' Beethoven was "brilliant". "It may take a few listens to get there, because this is unlike any record that you're likely to hear this year". In an enthusiastic review, Rolling Stone pictured the album as "nine songs of lethal grandeur built from [...] swollen waves of strings and fistfuls of piano and [...]  one-man operatic chorales". Reviewer David Frickle said the album was a "perfect cocktail", remarking that there was virtually no rock guitar apart for one song, before concluding "Trust me: It's not a problem". The List praised it as a "fantastic record",  for its "grand symphonic sweep of piano-based orchestral music."

Track listing

Personnel
 Russell Mael – vocals, programming, production, arrangements
 Ron Mael – keyboards, orchestrations, programming, production, arrangements
 Tammy Glover – drums, background vocals
 Dean Menta – guitar
 John Thomas – mixing, additional engineering
 Günther Koch – vocals on "Wunderbar"

DVD
Lil' Beethoven – Live in Stockholm
 "The Rhythm Thief"
 "How Do I Get to Carnegie Hall?"
 "What Are All These Bands So Angry About?"
 "I Married Myself"
 "Ride 'Em Cowboy"
 "My Baby's Taking Me Home"
 "Your Call's Very Important to Us. Please Hold"
 "Ugly Guys with Beautiful Girls"
 "Suburban Homeboy"
 "It's a Sparks Show"
 "National Crime Awareness Week"
 "Here in Heaven"
 "The Number One Song in Heaven"
 "Nothing to Do"
 "The Calm Before the Storm"
 "The Ghost of Liberace"
 "Talent Is an Asset"
 "Hospitality on Parade"
 "When I Kiss You (I Hear Charlie Parker Playing)"
 "This Town Ain't Big Enough for Both of Us"
 "When Do I Get to Sing 'My Way'?"
 "Amateur Hour"

Special features
 "The Legend of Lil' Beethoven"
 Soundcheck
 Backstage with Sparks
 Audience interviews / Meet the Fans
 Sparks facts

Live personnel
 Russell Mael – vocals
 Ron Mael – keyboards
 Tammy Glover – drums, timpani, percussion and backing vocals
 Dean Menta – guitar, timpani and backing vocals

Charts

References 

Sparks (band) albums
2002 albums
Art pop albums
Albums recorded in a home studio
Baroque pop albums
Neoclassical albums
Classical albums by American artists
Contemporary classical music albums